Paul Di Giacomo (born 30 June 1982, in Glasgow) is a Scottish footballer. He began his career at Kilmarnock, before dropping into the Scottish Football League First Division with Airdrie United and then Ross County. He also had loan spells from Kilmarnock with Stirling Albion and Partick Thistle.

Career
As a striker who can also play on the wing, Di Giacomo made his Kilmarnock debut in a 1–0 defeat of St Mirren in July 2000. He was loaned to Stirling Albion for part of the 2004–05 season. He again went out on loan in August 2007, this time to Partick Thistle. At Partick he scored twice; once against Berwick Rangers in a Challenge Cup tie and once against future club Greenock Morton in the league. He was released by the Rugby Park side in June 2008 and a week later was snapped up by Scottish First Division side Airdrie United. He moved to Ross County on 1 June 2009.

Di Giacomo scored on his debut for Ross County against his old club Airdrie United in the opening game of the 09/10 season. He continued his good start to the opening season with a goal against Inverness CT.

He joined Greenock Morton in June 2011, and scored four goals on his debut against Stranraer in the Challenge Cup. On 1 May 2012, Di Giacomo confirmed that he would leave the club at the end of the season to go part-time. In July 2012, he signed for former club Airdrie United. His contract with Airdrie United was terminated by mutual consent in April 2013.

He retired from football in 2013 and is now the head of academy at Kilmarnock.

Honours

Scottish League Challenge Cup
2008–09 (with Airdrie United)
2010–11 (with Ross County)
Top Scorer: 2011–12 Scottish Challenge Cup (with Greenock Morton)

References

External links

Living people
Footballers from Glasgow
Sportspeople from Rutherglen
1982 births
Scottish footballers
Association football forwards
Kilmarnock F.C. players
Stirling Albion F.C. players
Partick Thistle F.C. players
Airdrieonians F.C. players
Ross County F.C. players
Greenock Morton F.C. players
Scottish Premier League players
Scottish Football League players
People educated at St Aloysius' College, Glasgow
Scottish people of Italian descent
Footballers from South Lanarkshire